Sin Sex & Salvation (1994), is an EP released by KMFDM and Raymond Watts (as PIG).  The artist for it is usually listed as KMFDM vs. PIG.

Track listing

Personnel
PIG:
Raymond Watts - vocals, programming
KMFDM:
Sascha Konietzko - vocals, bass, synths, programming, mixing
Svet Am (Günter Schulz) - guitars
Jennifer Ginsberg - vocals (3, 6)

References

KMFDM albums
Pig (musical project) albums
1994 EPs
Collaborative albums